Timothy Joseph Jordan (February 14, 1879 – September 13, 1949) was a professional baseball player.  He was a first baseman over parts of seven seasons with the Washington Senators, New York Highlanders and Brooklyn Superbas.  He led the National League and tied for the major league lead in home runs in 1906, becoming the first rookie with a share of the major league home run crown (later joined by Mark McGwire in 1987 and Pete Alonso in 2019) with Brooklyn, and won the NL home run title again in 1908.

Jordan also created and marketed a baseball-themed card game, the "T.J. Jordan In Door Card Game". He was born and later died at the age of 70 in New York City.

See also
 List of Major League Baseball annual home run leaders

References

External links

National League home run champions
1879 births
1949 deaths
Major League Baseball first basemen
Baseball players from New York (state)
Washington Senators (1901–1960) players
New York Highlanders players
Brooklyn Superbas players
Newark Sailors players
Toronto Maple Leafs (International League) players
Buffalo Bisons (minor league) players
Binghamton Bingoes players
Richmond Clippers players
Syracuse Stars (minor league baseball) players
Burials at Gate of Heaven Cemetery (Hawthorne, New York)